"Original Sin" is a 2001 song performed by English musician Elton John from his 26th studio album, Songs from the West Coast. The song was written by Elton John and Bernie Taupin and is the final single of the album.

"Original Sin" is a slow song with a sweet and melancholy melody focused on Elton's piano playing and featuring Rusty Anderson on guitars and producer Patrick Leonard on keyboards. The orchestral arrangement is by Paul Buckmaster.

The song is believed to have been written about the failed marriage between John and his ex-wife Renate Blauel (The second song about their marriage after "Blue Avenue" on his 1989 album Sleeping with the Past). The singer implies the relationship as an original sin because even though he loved his wife very much, he wasn't being true to himself and his attractions. As John stated on his marriage to Blauel, "She was the classiest woman I’ve ever met, but it wasn’t meant to be. I was living a lie."

Chart performance
Released in 2002 (on a promo-only basis in the United States), the single had limited commercial success; it reached #39 in the UK and #18 in the US adult contemporary music chart.

Performances
John performed "Original Sin" on various locations, and he stated in a 2009 concert on Palais des Congrés, Paris, France with Ray Cooper that the song was the most requested song by his fans, asking him to perform it through letters.

Music video
Directed by David LaChapelle, the music video stars Mandy Moore and Elizabeth Taylor. The storyline of the video talks about a lonely girl who daydreams about seeing Elton John in concert during the 1970's where she meets an array of celebrities from that era.

Track listing

 CD Single (UK, including the video for This Train Don't Stop There Anymore)

 "Original Sin" – 4:49
 "I'm Still Standing" (live) – 3:20
 "This Train Don't Stop There Anymore" (live) – 4:24

 CD Single (UK, including the video for This Train Don't Stop There Anymore)

 "Original Sin" – 4:49
 "Original Sin" (live) – 4:54
 "All the Girls Love Alice" (live) – 4:55

 Maxi single 12" (USA)

 "Original Sin" (Junior's Earth Mix) – 10:35
 "Original Sin" (Junior's Earthbeats) – 5:28
 "Original Sin" (Junior's Earthdub) – 6:45
 "Original Sin" (Junior's Earthstrumental) – 10:35

Awards
Grammy Awards

|-
|  style="width:35px; text-align:center;" rowspan="2"|2003 || rowspan="2"| "Original Sin" || Best Pop Vocal Performance – Male || 
|-

Charts

References

External links 
 textOriginal Sinand translation in Italian

2002 singles
Elton John songs
2002 songs
Songs with music by Elton John
Songs with lyrics by Bernie Taupin
Mercury Records singles
Music videos directed by David LaChapelle